Naya Nangal railway station is a small railway station in Rupnagar district, Punjab. Its code is NNGL. It serves Naya Nangal city. The station consists of two platforms. The existing platforms are undergoing development and many sanitation and water facilities are also being provided on the platforms. The station is connected by a broad-gauge railway line, which is the only railway line in the Himachal Pradesh.

Major trains

 Himachal Express
 Amb Andaura–Ambala DMU
 Amb Andaura–Nangal Dam Passenger

References

Railway stations in Rupnagar district
Ambala railway division